Murdochella levifoliata is a species of minute wentletrap, a sea snail, a marine gastropod mollusk or micromollusk in the family Nystiellidae, commonly known as wentletraps.

This species is only known to occur in New Zealand.

References

 Powell A W B, New Zealand Mollusca, William Collins Publishers Ltd, Auckland, New Zealand 1979 

Nystiellidae
Gastropods of New Zealand
Gastropods described in 1906